Mattia Biagi (born 1974 in Ravenna) is an Italian professional artist. He currently resides and works in Los Angeles.

Professional background 
Biagi's work is shown internationally at galleries and museums such as The Mint Museum of Craft + Design in Charlotte, North Carolina.

Not long after graduating art and design school in Milan, Mattia Biagi arrived in Los Angeles. He was immediately impressed by one of the city’s most famous landmarks, the La Brea Tar Pits, which became the influence for his initial body of work in the U.S.

"I was intrigued with tar as a medium and how it illuminates and highlights objects in a very esoteric and ethereal sense."

The mix of a traditional Italian background with life in America has made quite an impact on his creative process.

In this new body of work, Biagi explores through multi-media forms the desire to make tangible a belief in supernatural causality and its cultural nuances.

By traversing abstract sculpture, video, painting, photography and performance he will investigate human emotional reaction to physical objects that have superstitious associations.

Galleries and exhibits

Solo exhibitions

Group exhibitions

Public and Selected Notable Private Collections 

Before Midnight - Mint Museum - North Carolina - NC (2012)

Print media

Further reading 
 Taglialagamba, Sara; and Galluzzi, Francesco. Mattia Biagi - Black Tar, Milan: Skira, 2011.

References

External links 
 
 http://www.mintmuseum.org/craft-design.html

1974 births
Living people
Italian contemporary artists